Eastern Counties 3 is an English level 11 Rugby Union league, currently divided into 3 regional leagues (north, south, west). Promoted teams moved up to the relevant regional divisions in Eastern Counties 2 while since the abolition of Eastern Counties 4 at the end of the 2016–17 season there has been no relegation. For most of its history, Eastern Counties 3 was divided into two regional divisions – north and south – with teams from Cambridgeshire, Norfolk, Suffolk and Essex taking part. A breakaway of Essex teams at the end of the 2002–03 to form a new league would lead to Eastern Counties 3 being abolished by the end of 2003–04 only to return due to a league restructure to cater for more 2nd and 3rd teams.

Original teams
When league rugby began in 1987 this division contained the following teams:

Beccles
Harwich & Dovercourt
Holt 
Lakenham Hewett
Maldon
Newmarket
Old Edwardians
South Woodham Ferrers
Southwold
Wisbech
Wymondham

Eastern Counties 3 honours

Eastern Counties 3 (1987–1993)

The original Eastern Counties 3 was a tier 10 league with promotion up to Eastern Counties 2 and relegation down to Eastern Counties 4.

Eastern Counties 3 (1993–96)

The creation of National 5 South meant that Eastern Counties 3 dropped from a tier 10 league to a tier 11 league for the years that National 5 South was active.  Promotion and relegation continued to Eastern Counties 2 and Eastern Counties 4 respectively.

Eastern Counties 3 (1996–1997)

The cancellation of National 5 South at the end of the 1995–96 season meant that Eastern Counties 3 reverted to being a tier 10 league.  Promotion continued to Eastern Counties 2, while relegation was to Eastern Counties 4.

Eastern Counties 3: North / South (1997–2000)

Ahead of the 1997–98 season Eastern Counties 3 was split into two regional divisions - north and south - with both divisions remaining as tier 10 leagues.  Promotion and relegation continued to Eastern Counties 2, while relegation was to Eastern Counties 4 - now split into two regional divisions (north and south).

Eastern Counties 3: North / South (2000–2004)

the introduction of London 4 North East ahead of the 2000–01 season meant that Eastern Counties North and South dropped to once again become tier 11 leagues.  The regionalisation of Eastern Counties 2 meant that promotion was now to either Eastern Counties 2 North or Eastern Counties 2 South, while the cancellation of Eastern Counties 4 at the end of the 1999–00 season meant there was no longer relegation.  The creation of Essex 1, Essex 2 and Essex 3 ahead of the 2003–04 season, meant that Essex based sides left the Eastern Counties leagues.  This in turn would lead to the cancellation of Eastern Counties 3 North and South  at the end of the 2003–04 season, with all teams transferred to relevant divisions in Eastern Counties 2.

Eastern Counties 3: North / South / West (2014—present)

After an absence of nine years, Eastern Counties 3 was re-introduced as a tier 11 league ahead of the 2014–15 season, this time split into three regional divisions - north, south and west.  Promotion was to the respective regional division in Eastern Counties 2, and relegation was to Eastern Counties 4 - north or south - until that league was cancelled at the end of the 2016–17 season

Number of league titles

Aldeburgh & Thorpeness (1)
Bancroft (1)
Beccles (1) 
Beccles II (1)
Billericay (1)
Brightlingsea (1)
Broadland – Great Yarmouth (1)
Burnham-On-Crouch (1)
Campion (1)
Colchester III (1)
Dereham (1)
Diss III (1)
East London (1)
Ely II
Fakenham (1)
Hadleigh (1)
Ipswich Y.M. (1)
Loughton (1)
March Bears (1)
May & Baker (1)
Newmarket (1)
North Walsham (1)
Old Cooperians (1)
Old Edwardians (1)
Ravens (1)
Sawston (1)
Shelford V (1)
South Woodham Ferrers (1)
Southwold (1) 
Southwold II (1)
Stanford Le Hope (1)
Stowmarket (1)
Swaffham (1)
Thurston II (1)
Wisbech (1)
Woodbridge II (1)
Wymondham (1)

See also
London & SE Division RFU
Eastern Counties RU
Essex RFU
English rugby union system
Rugby union in England

Notes

References

11
Rugby union in Essex
Rugby union in Cambridgeshire
Rugby union in Norfolk
Rugby union in Suffolk